Samuel Victor Railton (28 February 1906 – 23 July 1996) was a Liberal party member of the House of Commons of Canada. He was born in Kelvin, Ontario and became a physician and surgeon by career.

Railton studied medicine at the University of Toronto after graduation from Brantford Collegiate Institute. After establishing a medical practice at Port Colborne, Ontario, he served in the Royal Canadian Army Medical Corps between 1940 and 1945. Following World War II, he became a surgeon in Welland, Ontario, and volunteered his skills in 1970 for the Nigerian Civil War.

He was first elected at the Welland riding in the 1972 general election and was re-elected there in the 1974 election. He left federal politics after completing his term in the 30th Parliament.

References

External links
 

1906 births
1996 deaths
Physicians from Ontario
Canadian surgeons
Members of the House of Commons of Canada from Ontario
Liberal Party of Canada MPs
University of Toronto alumni
People from Port Colborne
20th-century Canadian physicians
People of the Nigerian Civil War
Canadian expatriates in Nigeria
20th-century surgeons